Kevin Ball (born 12 November 1964) is an English former professional footballer who played for Portsmouth, Sunderland, Fulham and Burnley. Since his retirement, he has held a number of positions at Sunderland, including twice being caretaker manager, and has recently retired from working as club ambassador.

Playing career

Born in Hastings, Ball began his career in central defence but eventually moved into central midfield. He played 389 games for Sunderland in all competitions, scoring 27 goals. His career took off with a spell at Portsmouth and, after leaving Sunderland, he had spells at Fulham and Burnley. Whilst at Sunderland, he played in the 1992 FA Cup Final where they lost 2–0 to Liverpool.

Ball, a former club captain, was named Sunderland Player of the Year for the 1990–91 season, and again in 1996–97, the year they were relegated from the Premier League. He was part of the Sunderland sides that won First Division titles in 1996 and 1999.

Managerial career
Between 6 March and 8 May 2006 Ball acted as Sunderland caretaker manager for the last ten games of the 2005–06 season following the sacking of Mick McCarthy, taking five points from these games. Although Ball expressed his interest in the manager's job on a full-time basis, incoming chairman Niall Quinn was keen for the club to appoint a 'world-class manager' following the club's takeover by the Drumaville Consortium, ruling Ball out of the running. Ball remained at Sunderland under the new regime, returning to his former post of assistant academy manager.

Manager Martin O'Neill promoted Ball to become the club's senior professional development coach in July 2012, which included being responsible for the club's reserve team and the club's under-21 players. In 2013, he again became caretaker manager following the sacking of Paolo Di Canio. Ball's first game in charge resulted in a 2–0 home win over Peterborough in the League Cup. He oversaw a further two games, before Gus Poyet was appointed to the role. After a long spell as a Club Ambassador at Sunderland he was made redundant in 2022.

Honours and awards

As a player
Sunderland
Football League First Division winner: 1995–96, 1998–99
FA Cup runner up: 1991–92

Individual
Sunderland Player of the Year: 1996/97
Sunderland Solid Gold XI

References

External links

Kevin Ball: A profile
Ball named caretaker manager

1964 births
Living people
Sportspeople from Hastings
English footballers
Coventry City F.C. players
Portsmouth F.C. players
Sunderland A.F.C. players
Fulham F.C. players
Burnley F.C. players
Premier League players
English Football League players
English football managers
Sunderland A.F.C. managers
Premier League managers
Sunderland A.F.C. non-playing staff
Association football central defenders
Association football midfielders
FA Cup Final players